The 1932 GP Ouest-France was the second edition of the GP Ouest-France cycle race and was held on 30 August 1932. The race started and finished in Plouay. The race was won by Philippe Bono.

General classification

References

1932
1932 in road cycling
1932 in French sport